Vaginicolidae is a family of peritrichs in the order Sessilida.

References

External links 
 

Oligohymenophorea
Ciliate families